Utricularia pierrei is a medium-sized, probably perennial carnivorous plant that belongs to the genus Utricularia. It is native to Indochina and can be found in Thailand and southern Vietnam. It was originally described by François Pellegrin in 1920 in honor of the original collector of the species.

See also 
 List of Utricularia species

References 

Carnivorous plants of Asia
Flora of Thailand
Flora of Vietnam
pierrei